The Vagliano Trophy is a biennial women's amateur golf tournament. It is co-organised by The R&A and the European Golf Association and is contested by teams representing "Great Britain and Ireland" and the "Continent of Europe". It is played in odd-numbered years; the Curtis Cup being played in even-numbered years.

The event started in 1931 as a match between Great Britain and France. It was played annually from 1931 to 1939 and from 1947 to 1949, before becoming a biennial event from 1949 to 1957. Britain won 15 of the 16 matches with the 1934 match being tied. From 1949 to 1957 Great Britain had also played a biennial match against Belgium. In 1959 the two matches were replaced by one with Britain playing a team representing the Continent of Europe, the Vagliano Trophy being used for the new event.

The trophy was given by André Vagliano, a French golfer and official in the French Golf Federation and also father of Lally Segard, who played in this match on 13 occasions. The Ladies Golf Union initially declined to accept the trophy but changed their mind in late 1932, accepting the Curtis Cup at the same time.

Format
The competition involves various match play matches between players selected from the two teams of 8, either singles and foursomes. The winner of each match scores a point for their team, with half a point each for any match that is tied after 18 holes. If the entire match is tied, the previously winning team retains the Trophy.

A foursomes match is a competition between two teams of two golfers. The golfers on the same team take alternate shots throughout the match, with the same ball. Each hole is won by the team that completes the hole in the fewest shots. A fourball match is a competition between two teams of two golfers. All four golfers play their own ball throughout the round. Each hole is won by the team whose individual golfer had the lowest score. A singles match is a standard match play competition between two golfers.

The contest is played over two days, with four foursomes and eight singles matches on each day, a total of 24 points. Before 1975 there were five foursomes and ten singles matches each day. In 1959 and 1961 there were five 36-hole foursomes on the first day and ten 36-hole singles on the second. All matches after 1961 have been over 18 holes.

Results
Since the Continent of Europe replaced France in 1959.

Of the 31 contests from 1959 to 2019, Great Britain and Ireland have won 15, the Continent of Europe have won 15 matches with 1 match tied (1979).

The results of matches against France between 1931 and 1957 are given below. Matches consisted of three foursomes matches and six singles matches, played on a single day.

Britain won 15 of the 16 matches with the 1934 match being tied.

Great Britain & Ireland v Belgium
From 1949 to 1957 Great Britain & Ireland also played a match against Belgium. The match was played just before or just after the match against France, Great Britain & Ireland using the same squad for both matches, Great Britain & Ireland won all five matches by large margins. In 1950 Margaret Wallace-Williamson presented a trophy for the event.

Future sites 
2023 - Royal Dornoch

Teams

Great Britain & Ireland
1931 Elsie Corlett, Diana Fishwick, Marjorie Ross Garon, Molly Gourlay, Jean McCulloch, Wanda Morgan, Charlotte Watson, Joyce Wethered
1932 Diana Fishwick, Marjorie Ross Garon, Molly Gourlay, Clem Montgomery, Wanda Morgan, Doris Park, Eithne Pentony, Charlotte Watson
1933 Diana Fishwick, Kathleen Garnham, Molly Gourlay, Helen Holm, Clem Montgomery, Wanda Morgan, Doris Park, Diana Plumpton
1934 Pam Barton, Millicent Couper, Diana Fishwick, Helen Holm, Mary Jestyn Jeffreys, Wanda Morgan, Dorothy Pearson, Phyllis Wade
1935 Jessie Anderson, Nan Baird, Mervyn Barton, Helen Holm, Wanda Morgan, Phyllis Wade, Pat Walker
1936 Jessie Anderson, Pam Barton, Elsie Corlett, Kathleen Garnham, Marjorie Ross Garon, Helen Holm, Bridget Newell, Phyllis Wade
1937 Pam Barton, Elsie Corlett, Kathleen Garnham, Marjorie Ross Garon, Helen Holm, Clem Montgomery, Bridget Newell, Phyllis Wade
1938 Jessie Anderson, Pam Barton, Elsie Corlett, Molly Gourlay, Helen Holm, Doris Park, Pat Walker
1939 Jessie Anderson, Pam Barton, Elsie Corlett, Molly Gourlay, Edith Rhodes, Pat Walker, Joy Winn, Phyllis Wylie
1947 Katharine Cairns, Jean Donald, Jacqueline Gordon, Helen Holm, Maureen Ruttle, Frances Stephens, Jessie Valentine, Phyllis Wylie
1948 Zara Bolton, Jean Donald, Jacqueline Gordon, Maureen Garrett, Helen Holm, Moira Paterson, Frances Stephens, Mollie Wallis
1949 Jeanne Bisgood, Jean Donald, Vyvian Falconer, Philomena Garvey, Helen Holm, Moira Paterson, Frances Stephens, Jessie Valentine
1951 Jeanne Bisgood, Katharine Cairns, Jean Donald, Philomena Garvey, Joan Gee, Moira Paterson, Jessie Valentine
1953 Katharine Cairns, Jean Donald, Dorothy Forster, Philomena Garvey, Jane Machin, Elizabeth Price, Frances Stephens
1955 Philomena Garvey, Ann Howard, Marjorie Peel, Elizabeth Price, Betty Singleton, Frances Smith, Jane Sugden, Jessie Valentine
1957 Philomena Garvey, Ann Howard, Bridget Jackson, Elizabeth Price, Janette Robertson, Marigold Speir, Angela Ward
1959: Angela Bonallack, Philomena Garvey, Bridget Jackson, Belle McCorkindale, Margaret Nichol, Ruth Porter, Elizabeth Price, Janette Robertson, Tessa Ross Steen, Frances Smith, Marley Spearman, Anne Whittaker
1961: Angela Bonallack, Sally Bonallack, Julia Greenhalgh, Joan Hastings, Ann Irvin, Ainslie Lurie, Margaret Nichol, Ruth Porter, Diane Robb, Marley Spearman, Sheila Vaughan, Janette Wright
1963: Susan Armitage, Sally Barber, Angela Bonallack, Liz Chadwick, Philomena Garvey, Ann Irvin, Bridget Jackson, Joan Lawrence, Jean Roberts, Belle Robertson, Dorothea Sommerville, Janette Wright
1965: Susan Armitage, Ita Burke, Gillian Cheetham, Marjory Fowler, Julia Greenhalgh, Ann Irvin, Bridget Jackson, Joan Lawrence, Ruth Porter, Marley Spearman, Jill Thornhill, Sheila Vaughan
1967: Gwen Brandom, Liz Chadwick, Mary Everard, Sarah German, Ann Irvin, Bridget Jackson, Annette Laing, Dinah Oxley, Margaret Pickard, Vivien Saunders, Joan Rennie, Pam Tredinnick
1969: Heather Anderson, Sally Barber, Elaine Bradshaw, Barbara Dixon, Mary Everard, Ann Irvin, Mary McKenna, Dinah Oxley, Kathryn Phillips, Belle Robertson, Margaret Wenyon
1971: Elaine Bradshaw, Audrey Briggs, Linda Denison-Pender, Mary Everard, Beverly Huke, Ann Irvin, Mary McKenna, Dinah Oxley, Kathryn Phillips, Belle Robertson, Michelle Walker
1973: Audrey Briggs, Linda Denison-Pender, Mary Everard, Carol Le Feuvre, Ann Irvin, Mary McKenna, Maisey Mooney, Sandra Needham, Tegwen Perkins, Carole Redford, Thomasina Walker
1975: Suzanne Cadden, Julia Greenhalgh, Beverly Huke, Ann Irvin, Mary McKenna, Sandra Needham, Tegwen Perkins, Anne Stant, Maureen Walker
1977: Mary Gorry, Julia Greenhalgh, Vanessa Marvin, Mary McKenna, Catherine Panton, Tegwen Perkins, Joan Smith, Muriel Thomson, Angela Uzielli
1979: Sandra Cohen, Sue Hedges, Mary McKenna, Maureen Madill, Janet Melville, Claire Nesbitt, Tegwen Perkins, Vicki Rawlings, Gillian Stewart
1981: Wilma Aitken, Jane Connachan, Claire Hourihane, Mary McKenna, Maureen Madill, Mandy Rawlings, Belle Robertson, Gillian Stewart, Pamela Wright
1983: Wilma Aitken, Jane Connachan, Kitrina Douglas, Claire Hourihane, Beverley New, Gillian Stewart, Vicki Thomas, Jill Thornhill, Claire Waite
1985: Linda Bayman, Lillian Behan, Maureen Garner, Claire Hourihane, Trish Johnson, Mary McKenna, Belle Robertson, Vicki Thomas, Jill Thornhill
1987: Fiona Anderson, Linda Bayman, Janet Collingham, Karen Davies, Claire Hourihane, Mary McKenna, Susan Shapcott, Vicki Thomas, Jill Thornhill
1989: Helen Dobson, Lora Fairclough, Elaine Farquharson, Julie Hall, Claire Hourihane, Shirley Huggan, Kathryn Imrie, Catriona Lambert, Vicki Thomas
1991: Nicola Buxton, Fiona Edmond, Elaine Farquharson, Caroline Hall, Julie Hall, Claire Hourihane, Catriona Lambert, Joanne Morley, Vicki Thomas
1993: Nicola Buxton, Julie Hall, Joanne Hockley, Catriona Lambert, Mhairi McKay, Janice Moodie, Joanne Morley, Kirsty Speak, Lisa Walton
1995: Emma Duggleby, Julie Hall, Hazel Kavenagh, Sandy Lambert, Mhairi McKay, Janice Moodie, Eileen Rose Power, Alison Rose, Lisa Walton
1997: Rebecca Hudson, Mhairi McKay, Janice Moodie, Becky Morgan, Eileen Rose Power, Elaine Ratcliffe, Alison Rose, Kim Rostron, Karen Stupples
1999: Kim Andrew, Fiona Brown, Alison Coffey, Anne Laing, Laura Moffat, Hilary Monaghan, Becky Morgan, Lesley Nicholson, Suzanne O'Brien
2001: Kim Andrew, Becky Brewerton, Fiona Brown, Alison Coffey, Emma Duggleby, Kirsty Fisher, Rebecca Hudson, Fame More, Kerry Smith
2003: Becky Brewerton, Emma Duggleby, Lynn Kenny, Anne Laing, Vikki Laing, Tricia Mangan, Danielle Masters, Fame More, Clare Queen
2005: Claire Coughlan, Martina Gillen, Felicity Johnson, Anne Laing, Heather MacRae, Tricia Mangan, Clare Queen, Kerry Smith, Sophie Walker
2007: Rachel Bell, Liz Bennett, Krystle Caithness, Tara Delaney, Naomi Edwards, Sahra Hassan, Breanne Loucks, Melissa Reid, Kerry Smith
2009: Jodi Ewart, Rachel Jennings, Leona Maguire, Lisa Maguire, Danielle McVeigh, Pamela Pretswell, Rhian Wyn Thomas, Kylie Walker, Sally Watson
2011: Amy Boulden, Holly Clyburn, Louise Kenney, Kelsey Macdonald, Danielle McVeigh, Leona Maguire, Stephanie Meadow, Pamela Pretswell, Kelly Tidy
2013: Amy Boulden, Gabrielle Cowley, Hayley Davis, Georgia Hall, Becky Harries, Bronte Law, Stephanie Meadow, Alexandra Peters, Amber Ratcliffe
2015: Gemma Clews, Hayley Davis, Alice Hewson, Bronte Law, Meghan Maclaren, Leona Maguire, Olivia Mehaffey, Charlotte Thomas, Chloe Williams
2017: Gemma Clews, India Clyburn, Maria Dunne, Alice Hewson, Sophie Lamb, Leona Maguire, Olivia Mehaffey, Annabel Wilson
2019: Annabell Fuller, Alice Hewson, Lily May Humphreys, Hazel MacGarvie, Julie McCarthy, Shannon McWilliam, Emily Toy, Isobel Wardle

Continent of Europe

1959: Arlette Engel-Jacquet, Annelies Eschauzier, Isa Goldschmid, Marietta Gütermann, Monika Möller, Martine Paul, Janine Prion, Lally Segard, Odile Semelaigne, Anne van Riemsdijk, Brigitte Varangot, Andrée Villers
1961: Vanda Rosa Bohus de Világos, Claudine Cros, Mercedes Etchart de Artiach, Arlette Engel-Jacquet, Martine Gajan, Isa Goldschmid, M Mahé, Lally Segard, Louise van der Berghe, Anne van Riemsdijk, Brigitte Varangot
1963: Claudine Cros, Arlette Engel-Jacquet, Annelies Eschauzier, Liv Forsell, Isa Goldschmid, Marietta Gütermann, Monika Möller, Lally Segard, Monica Steegmann, Louise van der Berghe, Brigitte Varangot
1965: Claudine Cros, Liv Forsell, Odile Garaialde, Isa Goldschmid, Marietta Gütermann, Catherine Lacoste, Monika Möller, Marion Petersen, Annie van Lanschot, Anne van Riemsdijk, Brigitte Varangot
1967: Martine Cochet, Liv Forsell, Odile Garaialde, Isa Goldschmid, Alice Janmaat, Catherine Lacoste, Florence Mourgue d'Algue, Marion Petersen, Marina Ragher, Corinne Reybroeck, Lally Segard
1969: Joyce de Witt Puyt, Liv Forsell, Odile Garaialde, Martine Giraud, Isa Goldschmid, Alice Janmaat, Catherine Lacoste, Marion Petersen, Marina Ragher, Corinne Reybroeck, Brigitte Varangot
1971: Joyce de Witt Puyt, Liv Forsell, Odile Garaialde, Emma García-Ogara, Isa Goldschmid, Alice Janmaat, Annie Mackeson-Sandbach, Christina Nordström, Marion Petersen, Corinne Reybroeck, Brigitte Varangot
1973: Federica Dassù, Odile Garaialde, Martine Giraud, Isa Goldschmid, Marietta Gütermann, Joyce Heyster, Alice Janmaat, Catherine Lacoste, Anne Marie Palli, Anne Robert, Anna Skanse
1975: Cristina Marsans, Barbara Böhm, Carole Charbonnier, Marie-Christine de Werra, Martine Giraud, Anne Marie Palli, Marina Ragher, Corinne Reybroeck, Liv Wollin
1977: Barbara Böhm, Marie-Christine de Werra, Hillewi Hagström, Nathalie Jeanson, Anne Marie Palli, Barbara Rindi, Anna Skanse, Pia Tolomei, Liv Wollin
1979: Elaine Berthet, Barbara Böhm, Marie-Laure de Lorenzi, Marta Figueras-Dotti, Hillewi Hagström, Alice Janmaat, Cécilia Mourgue d'Algue, Marina Ragher, Marion Tannhäuser
1981: Cristina Marsans, Elaine Berthet, Marina Buscaini, Federica Dassù, Marta Figueras-Dotti, Elena Larrazábal Corominas, Carmen Maestre de Pellon, Cécilia Mourgue d'Algue, Liv Wollin
1983: Elaine Berthet, Marina Buscaini, Hillewi Hagström, Viveka Hoff, Martina Koch, Regine Lautens, Liselotte Neumann, Astrid Peter, Macarena Tey
1985: Emanuela Braito, Marie-Laure de Lorenzi-Taya, E Girardi, Martina Koch, Regine Lautens, Cécilia Mourgue d'Algue, Maria Orueta, Anna Oxenstierna, Aline Van der Haegen
1987: Helene Andersson, Caroline Bourtayre, Stefania Croce, Sofia Grönberg, Regine Lautens, Sophie Louapre, Mari Carmen Navarro, Sonia Wunsch, Aline Van der Haegen
1989: Lourdes Barbeito, Delphine Bourson, Caroline Bourtayre, Isabella Calogero, Macarena Campomanes, Silvia Cavalleri, Annika Östberg, Caterina Quintarelli, Aline Van der Haegen
1991: Maria Bertilsköld, Delphine Bourson, Silvia Cavalleri, Tina Fischer, Åsa Gottmo, Mette Hageman, Valérie Michaud, Laura Navarro, Caterina Quintarelli
1993: Delphine Bourson, Silvia Cavalleri, Stéphanie Dallongeville, Maria Hjorth, Anna-Carin Jonasson, Estefania Knuth, Laura Navarro, Maria José Pons, Vibeke Stensrud, 
1995: Sara Beautell, Silvia Cavalleri, Sofie Eriksson, Maria Hjorth, Kristel Mourgue d'Algue, Maria José Pons, Ana Sánchez, Vibeke Stensrud, Amandine Vincent
1997: Maïtena Alsuguren, Silvia Cavalleri, Marie Hedberg, Karine Icher, Ulrica Jidflo, Jessica Lindbergh, Marta Prieto, Ana Sánchez, Giulia Sergas
1999: Stéphanie Arricau, Martina Eberl, Tania Elósegui, Karine Icher, Marine Monnet, Miriam Nagl, Federica Piovano, Nicole Stillig, Marieke Zelsmann
2001: Martina Eberl, Tania Elósegui, Kristina Engström, Anna Gertsson, Claire Grignolo, Gwladys Nocera, Federica Piovano, Marta Prieto, Denise Simon
2003: Minea Blomqvist, Emma Cabrera-Bello, Tania Elósegui, Sophie Giquel, Bettina Hauert, Fanny Schaeffer, Dewi Claire Schreefel, Elisa Serramia, Lisa Holm Sørensen
2005: Emma Cabrera-Bello, Anne-Lise Caudal, María Hernández, Sheila Lee, Pernilla Lindberg, Belén Mozo, Katharina Schallenberg, Alexandra Vilatte, Adriana Zwanck
2007: Denise Becker, Emma Cabrera-Bello, Carlota Ciganda, Valentine Derrey, Sandra Gal, Pernilla Lindberg, Belén Mozo, Anna Nordqvist, Caroline Westrup
2009: Lucie André, Rosanna Crépiat, Laura Gonzalez Escallon, Pia Halbig, Caroline Hedwall, Caroline Masson, Marieke Nivard, Marion Ricordeau, Adriana Zwanck
2011: Alexandra Bonetti, Céline Boutier, Manon Gidali, Camilla Hedberg, Lara Katzy, Therese Koelbaek, Sophia Popov, Madelene Sagström, Marta Silva
2013: Céline Boutier, Nicole Broch Larsen, Natalia Escuriola, Quirine Eijkenboom, Noemí Jiménez Martín, Camilla Hedberg, Karolin Lampert, Emily Kristine Pedersen, Sophia Popov
2015: Céline Boutier, Olivia Cowan, Justine Dreher, Nuria Iturrioz, Noemí Jiménez Martín, Madelene Sagström, Luna Sobrón, Linnea Ström, Albane Valenzuela
2017: Virginia Elena Carta, Matilda Castren, Julia Engström, Morgane Métraux, Linnea Ström, Puk Lyng Thomsen, Albane Valenzuela, Dewi Weber
2019: Caterina Don, Linn Grant, Leonie Harm, Frida Kinhult, Alessia Nobilio, Pauline Roussin-Bouchard, Emma Spitz, Albane Valenzuela

See also
Junior Vagliano Trophy

References

External links
R&A site
Coverage on EGA site

Amateur golf tournaments
R&A championships
Team golf tournaments
Women's golf tournaments